The Hampstead Antiquarian and Historical Society was a local history society devoted to the history of Hampstead, London.  Founded in 1897, the society first met at Hampstead Town Hall. The group was active until at least 1940 and published a journal known as the Transactions of the Hampstead Antiquarian and Historical Society.

Members and officers
The first president of the society was Sir Walter Besant. Local historians Thomas Barratt and George William Potter were members. Richard Garnett (1835 – 1906) was president. In 1922, Andrew Thomas Taylor was president.

References

Hampstead
History of London
History of Middlesex
Historical societies of the United Kingdom
Defunct organisations based in London
Defunct clubs and societies of the United Kingdom